In Japanese religion, Yahata (八幡神, ancient Shinto pronunciation) formerly in Shinto and later commonly known as Hachiman (八幡神, Japanese Buddhist pronunciation) is the syncretic divinity of archery and war, incorporating elements from both Shinto and Buddhism. 

In Shinto religion, he is mortally Emperor Ōjin (応神天皇, Ōjin Tennō) by birth who reigned in the 3rd–4th century and the son of Empress Jingū (神功皇后, Jingū-kōgō), later became deified and identified by legend as "Yahata-no-kami" meaning "Kami of Eight Banners", referring to the eight heavenly banners that signaled the birth of the divine and deified emperor, and is also called Hondawake (誉田別命). His messenger is the dove, symbolizes both the bow and arrow found in samurai banners associated to him where he is called "Yumiya Hachiman" (弓矢八幡).

Since ancient times Hachiman has been worshiped by farmers as the god of agriculture and by fishermen, who hoped that he would fill their nets with many fish.

During the age of the samurai, descendants of both samurai clans, Seiwa Genji (清和源氏 Seiwa Gen-ji, a line of the Minamoto clan descended from Emperor Seiwa) and Kanmu Taira (桓武平氏 Kanmu Taira'u-ji/ Hei-shi/ Hei-ji, a line of the Taira clan descended from Emperor Kanmu) honored Hachiman, from which the tradition is derived nationwide in which samurai clans (武家 "buke" in Japanese) honor Hachiman as the deity sacred to them. His other roles include determining a samurai's fate—i.e., whether they are a success or failure in battle; controlling and protecting the martial arts; and proclaiming the victory of an army.

Although often called the god of war, he is more strictly defined as the tutelary god of warriors. He is also the divine protector of Japan, the Japanese people and the Imperial House.

Summary of Hachiman 
In the present form of Shinto, Hachiman is the divine spirit of Emperor Ōjin. Emperor Kinmei (欽明天皇, Kinmei-tennō) in his Regnal Year 32 (571 AD) decreed that the deified Emperor Ōjin was revealed for the first time in the land of Usa (宇佐の地)—the present-day city of Usa, in Oita Prefecture—where he became the patron deity of this city, along with a lesser Shinto female deity called Himegami (比売神) and the Emperor's mother, Empress Jingū.  This trio, known as Hachiman Mikami (八幡三神) is enshrined there. 

Amongst the Hachiman Mikami, there are many shrines that enshrines other figures apart from the trio, like Emperor Chūai (仲哀天皇, Chūai-tennō) instead of Empress Jingū, the legendary hero and Shinto deity Takenouchi no Sukune or Takeshiuchi no Sukune (武内宿禰) and the female deity Tamayori-hime (玉依毘売命 or 玉依姫尊), where there is a dedicated prayer for safe childbirth in the Shinto shrine of Umi Hachimangū (宇美八幡宮) in Umi, Fukuoka prefecture.

Himegami

The three Munakata goddesses (宗像三女神 Munakata Sanjoshin) born from the divination ritual Ukehi or Ukei (宇気比, 誓約, 祈, 誓, 誓占, lit. "pledge divination") between the goddess Amaterasu and the god Susanoo - that is Tagitsu-hime (多岐津姫命), Ichikishima-hime (市杵嶋姫命) and Tagairi-hime (多紀理姫命) - is said where they descended from the heavens as the "Three Pillars of Usanoshima (宇佐嶋) of the ancient province of Tsukushi (筑紫)", located in a temple complex on Mt. Omotosan (御許山) in Usa. 

The Munakata goddesses are thereby the matriarchs of an ancient tribe and clan Munakata-shi (宗像氏, 宗形氏) which fishermen worshipped collectively as a whole. It is thought that the worship of Munakata goddesses by the Munakata clan was due to Empress Jingū's success in the "Conquest of the Three Kingdoms (of Korea)" (三韓征伐 Sankan Seipatsu). Therefore, they are old Shinto folk deities (地主神 jinushigami) before the presence of Hachiman. 

Himegami (比売神) is thought to be the consort or aunt of Hachiman, whereas Tamayori-hime (玉依毘売命 or 玉依姫尊) possibly and perhaps as the mother viewed by opinion aforementioned. Since the description of Hachiman as the Emperor Ojin appeared in the "Digest Record of Todai-ji Temple (東大寺要録 Tōdai-ji Yoroku)" and "Records of the Age of the Gods from the Sumiyoshi Grand Shrine (住吉大社神代記 Sumiyoshi-Taisha Jindaiki), the practice of merging Emperor Ōjin into Hachiman is estimated to have begun in the Nara Period or the Heian Period. 

There are also different theories and opinions concerning the goddesses Amaterasu and Kukuri-hime (菊理媛神 or 菊理媛命, a Shinto goddess venerated as Shirayama-hime (白山比咩), in which both called the goddess Himegami Himiko (卑弥呼, or Pimiko, also known as Shin-gi Wa-ō (親魏倭王, "Ruler of Wa, Friend of Wei"), a shamaness-queen of Yamatai-koku in Wakoku (倭国) around c. 170–248 AD.

Empress Jingū

Emperor Ojin was already destined to ascend the throne from the moment in the womb of his mother and Empress, is called "Emperor in the Womb", is based and interpreted sometimes in her belief as being the "mother deity" to the child-to-be who would be deified. The Three Munakata Goddesses, the Three Sumiyoshi Gods (住吉三神 Sumiyoshi Sanjin) and the goddess Amaterasu who were revered by the tribal clan Munakata-shi due to their aid in the "Conquest of the Three Kingdoms (of Korea)" is also worshiped in various places. It is said by tradition in commemoration after the conquest, Empress Jingu set up eight big military flags on Tsushima (対馬) which then became the origin of the name "Hirohatano Yahata Ōkami (広幡乃八幡大神)", also the origin of the name "Yahata (八幡)" to the Empress' son, the then-emperor Ojin.

Imperial Ancestor and Deity to the Imperial Family 
Since Hachiman was considered to be a divine spirit of the Emperor Ojin, he was placed as both the ancestor and Kōso-shin (皇祖神, "Imperial Ancestor Deity") of the Imperial Family of Japan. He was considered to be the guardian deity of the Imperial Household after the Grand Goddess Amaterasu written down in the "Chronicle of the Jōkyū Era" (承久記 Jōkyūki) to the "Compilation of the Grand Goddess Amaterasu of Ise and Hachiman Daibosatsu on the Imperial Throne of Japan". 

The founding of Konda Hachiman-gū (誉田八幡宮) Shrine at Habikino in Osaka Prefecture have been a long time linked with the connection to Emperor Ojin, therefore the Imperial Family also both revered the Usa Shrine (宇佐神宮 Usa Jingū, also known as 宇佐八幡宮 Usa Hachiman-gū) at Usa in Oita Prefecture, and the Iwashimizu Hachiman Shrine (石清水八幡宮 Iwashimizu Hachiman-gū) at Yawata in Kyoto Prefecture, as the second ancestral shrine after the dominant Ise Grand Shrine (伊勢神宮 Ise Jingū).

Syncretism of Hachiman in between Shinto and Buddhism

After the arrival of Buddhism in Japan, Hachiman became a syncretistic deity, fusing elements of the native kami worship with Buddhism (shinbutsu-shūgō). In the 8th century AD, he joined the Buddhist pantheon as  where his jinja (神社 - Shinto shrines) and jingu (神宮 - Shinto shrine of the Imperial family) were incorporated to shrines in Buddhist temples (寺 tera).

This transition happened when the Great Buddha of Tōdai-ji (東大寺, Eastern Great Temple) was being built and recorded in the era of the "First Year of Tenpyō-shōhō (天平勝宝 "Heavenly Peace and Victorious Treasure")" under the reign of Emperor Kōken in 749 AD, an oracle was declared by Hachiman to a senior Shinto priest (禰宜 negi) and nun from Usa Shrine to proceed to the capital (in Nara) that Hachiman would cooperate in the construction of a "Great Buddha" dedicated to him. From this recognition Hachiman was syncretised into Buddhism from early on. 

Then in the "First Year of the Era of Ten'ō (天応)" under the reign of Emperor Kōnin in 781 AD, the Shinto imperial court granted the Shinto deity Usa Hachiman (Hachiman of Usa) with Buddhist deity Hachiman Daibosatsu as the guardian god for the spiritual protection of the state. As a result, the spread of worship to Hachiman is transferred and received to Buddhist temples or shrines throughout the country where the "theory of Shinto and Buddhist syncretism (本地垂迹 Honji Suijaku)" is established, therefore considered Amitabha to be the Buddha manifestation of Hachiman. However, the Japanese Buddhist priest Nichiren (日蓮) of the Kamakura Period says he denies the theory and assumes the true form of Hachiman Daibosatsu is Shakyamuni Buddha (i.e. Gautama Buddha).

Thereafter in the Heian Period, veneration of Shinto shrines of Hachiman have been received and gathered throughout the nation by the samurai clans Seiwa of the Genji clan (清和源氏) and Kanmu of the Taira clan (桓武平氏). When the theory of syncretism has spread during this period, Hachiman is depicted to represent a Buddhist monk and is then called Sogyō Hachiman (僧形八幡神, "Buddhist Priest-Form Hachiman").

Worship of Hachiman by the Samurai

Because Emperor Ōjin was an ancestor of the Minamoto warrior clan, Hachiman became its . Minamoto no Yoshiie, upon coming of age at Iwashimizu Shrine in Kyoto, took the name Hachiman Taro Yoshiie, and, through his military prowess and virtue as a leader, came to be regarded and respected as the ideal samurai through the ages. After Minamoto no Yoritomo became shōgun and established the Kamakura shogunate, Hachiman's popularity grew and he became by extension the protector of the warrior class that the shōgun had brought to power. For this reason, the shintai of a Hachiman shrine is usually a stirrup or a bow.

Following the establishment of the Kamakura shogunate, the worship of Hachiman spread throughout Japan among not only samurai, but also the peasantry. There are now about 2,500 Shinto shrines dedicated to Hachiman, who has more shrines dedicated to him than any other deity except Inari. Usa Shrine in Usa, Ōita Prefecture is head shrine of all these shrines; other important Hachiman shrines are Iwashimizu Hachiman-gū, Hakozaki-gū and Tsurugaoka Hachiman-gū.

Hachiman's mon (emblem) is a mitsudomoe, a round whirlpool or vortex with three heads swirling right or left.  Many samurai clans used this mon as their own, including some that traced their ancestry back to the mortal enemy of the Minamoto, the Emperor Kanmu of the Taira clan (Kanmu Heishi).

See also 
 Hachiman shrine
 Kamikaze (typhoon)
 Minamoto no Yorinobu
 Minamoto no Yoriyoshi
 Bishamon -- Shinto-Buddhist God of War
 Hitogami

References

Further reading 
 "Hachiman" – Ancient History Encyclopedia

External links 
 

 
Japanese gods
Oracular deities
Shinbutsu shūgō
Shinto kami
War gods
Agricultural gods
Mythological archers